Parasani is a village in Etawah district of Uttar Pradesh. It is 7;km from [Etawah Railway Station] On Road No 62, And Nearest Tample Is Pilua Mahaveer (Hanuman Ji).
Most of the people are dependent on agriculture for living. Education facilities are very limited .

References

Villages in Etawah district